The Harold Hornburg House in Hartland, Wisconsin is a home designed by Eschweiler & Eschweiler to suggest an English cottage with a thatched roof, built in 1928.  The house was listed on the National Register of Historic Places in 1986 and on the State Register of Historic Places in 1989.

History
Harold Hornburg was a long-time dealer of Ford vehicles.  His 1.5-story home's walls are veneered with lannon stone.  The rolled eaves suggest a thatched roof, but are clad with modern shingles.  Hornburg and the contractor Harold Brockmeyer visited a house in Oshkosh with a similar roof and based the roof design on that. Along with the eaves, the low-to-the-ground profile of the house with no raised basement contributes to the impression of a Cotswold cottage.

References

Houses on the National Register of Historic Places in Wisconsin
National Register of Historic Places in Waukesha County, Wisconsin
Houses in Waukesha County, Wisconsin
Tudor Revival architecture in Wisconsin
Houses completed in 1928